The Kinko Sho (Japanese 金鯱賞) is a Grade 2 horse race for Thoroughbreds aged four and over run in March over a distance of 2000 metres at Chukyo Racecourse.

It was first run in 1965 and was promoted to Grade 3 in 1984 before becoming a Grade 2 race in 1996. The race was run in May until 2011 and in December from 2012 until 2016.

Winners since 2000 

 The 2010 and 2011 races took place at Kyoto Racecourse in May.

Earlier winners

 1984 - Towa Kachidoki
 1985 - Cannon Z
 1986 - Izumi Star
 1987 - Knockout
 1988 - Passing Power
 1989 - Marubutsu First
 1990 - Marron Glace
 1991 - Movie Star
 1992 - Ikuno Dictus
 1993 - Wish Dream
 1994 - Marvelous Crown
 1995 - Samani Beppin
 1996 - Fujiyama Kenzan
 1997 - Generalist
 1998 - Silence Suzuka
 1999 - Midnight Bet

See also
 Horse racing in Japan
 List of Japanese flat horse races

References

Turf races in Japan